The Russian Rugby Championship, officially known as the Liga Stavok - Russian Rugby Championship for sponsorship reasons, is Russia's top level professional men's rugby union competition. The Russian Rugby Championship is run by Russian Rugby Union and is contested by 10 teams as of the 2019-2020 season.

History
The founding of the league coincided with a period of rapid change for Russian rugby. The first Russian rugby championship, which succeeded the Soviet Rugby Championship, was played in 1992, under the name Russian Superleague. The league kept this name until 2004, when the competition was then rebranded as the Rugby Premier League.

In 2007, Yug-Krasnodar were admitted to the competition, increasing the number of teams in the league to eight.

Just one year later, in 2008, a further six teams from several of the lower division competitions were admitted into the Rugby Premier League. This increased the total number of teams again, to fourteen teams. The fourteen teams were split into three conferences, based on geography, in that season. One thing to note was that many of the elevated clubs geographically were semi-professional or even amateur in nature, which lead to a lack of competitive balance.

2010 saw another change of format to the Rugby Premier League where the East-West divide was removed, culminating in the formation of a 'Super Group'. This meant that VVA-Podmoskovye Monino, Krasny Yar, Enisey-STM, Slava Moscow, RC Novokuznetsk and Imperia-Dynamo as well as Fili Moscow and Spartak GM were scheduled to play each other in a straight home-and-away league format.

Current Teams

Current Teams
Note: Flags indicate national union as has been defined under WR eligibility rules. Players may hold more than one non-WR nationality

Champions

Winners by year

See also
Rugby union in Russia

External links
Official website 
Russian rugby statistics 

Professional Rugby League
Sports leagues established in 2005
2005 establishments in Russia
Russia
National rugby union premier leagues
rugby union
Professional sports leagues in Russia